Carlos Narciso Quintana Hernandez (born August 26, 1965) is a former Major League Baseball player who played for the Boston Red Sox from 1988 to 1993.

Professional career
Quintana was signed by the Red Sox in 1984 as an undrafted free agent.  Over the next four years he worked his way up the Red Sox minor league system playing for Elmira, Greensboro, New Britain and Pawtucket.

He made his first appearance for the Red Sox on September 16, 1988.  He split 1989 season between Pawtucket and Boston, and was named the full-time first baseman during spring training in 1990, beating out Bill Buckner for the job.  Over the next two seasons Quintana earned a reputation as an outstanding defensive first baseman and an intelligent batter who maintained a high on-base percentage, albeit without much power or speed.

In February 1992, Quintana was involved in an automobile accident in town of Tacarigua de Mamporal, Venezuela while rushing his two brothers to a hospital after they were shot at a party. In the accident, Quintana broke his left arm and his right big toe and his wife Solys broke both of her legs.  The injuries caused Quintana to miss the entire 1992 season.

Quintana returned to the Red Sox for the 1993 season but was still feeling the effects of the accident, including loss of feeling in his left thumb.  He lost the starting first base position to Mo Vaughn and at the end of the season he announced his retirement from MLB baseball, but spent more than a season in Venezuelan League and played the  season for the Buffalo Bisons, then a Triple-A affiliate of the Pittsburgh Pirates. In 1998 he played in Italy for Bbc Grosseto and hit four HR in a game against BC Modena.

Quintana was a .276 hitter (380-for-1376) with 19 home runs and 165 runs batted in, including 163 runs, 59 doubles, one triple and three stolen bases, as well as a .350 on-base percentage and 498 total bases for a .362 slugging average.

Highlights
 In 2014, he gained induction into the Caribbean Baseball Hall of Fame as part of its 18th Class. 
 Drove in six runs in the third inning of a game against the Texas Rangers on July 30, 1991, tying the major league record for most RBI in an inning.
 Played in a game in Pawtucket and a game in Boston on the same day in 1989.

See also
 List of Major League Baseball players from Venezuela

References

External links
, or Baseball Library, or Mexican League, or Venezuelan Baseball League

1965 births
Living people
Águilas del Zulia players
Boston Red Sox players
Buffalo Bisons (minor league) players
Caribes de Oriente players
Elmira Pioneers players
Greensboro Hornets players
Grosseto Baseball Club players
Venezuelan expatriate baseball players in Italy
Langosteros de Cancún players
Langosteros de Quintana Roo players
Leones de Yucatán players
Major League Baseball first basemen
Major League Baseball players from Venezuela
Mexican League baseball players
New Britain Red Sox players
Pawtucket Red Sox players
People from Miranda (state)
Petroleros de Minatitlán players
Saraperos de Saltillo players
Venezuelan expatriate baseball players in Mexico
Venezuelan expatriate baseball players in the United States